Ischnangela is a genus of moth in the family Cosmopterigidae. It contains only one species, Ischnangela eremocentra, which is found on Java.

References

External links

Natural History Museum Lepidoptera genus database

Cosmopterigidae